Under the Triple Suns is a science fiction novel by American writer Stanton A. Coblentz. It was first published in 1955 by Fantasy Press in an edition of 1,528 copies.

Plot introduction
The novel concerns the survivors of the destruction of the earth and their attempt at settling a new planet.

Reception
Galaxy reviewer Groff Conklin panned the novel, saying "it has nothing new or even interesting to offer." Anthony Boucher found the novel "sounds exactly like one of [Coblentz's] first science-fantasies back in 1928 . . . tinged with some amusing topsy-turvy satire." P. Schuyler Miller found the novel marked by "heavy-handed satire" that "bludgeoned" the reader.

References

Sources

External links

1955 American novels
1955 science fiction novels
American science fiction novels
Science fantasy novels
Post-apocalyptic novels
Works by Stanton A. Coblentz
Fantasy Press books